Kazimír Verkin (born 27 March 1972 in Brezno) is a Slovak race walker. He set a personal best time of 3:57:17, by finishing sixth in the 50 km at the European Athletics Race Walking Permit Meeting in Dudince.

Verkin made his official debut for the 2004 Summer Olympics in Athens, where he placed thirty-sixth in the men's 50 km race walk, with a time of 4:13:11.

Four years after competing in his first Olympics, Verkin qualified for his second Slovak team, as a 36-year-old, at the 2008 Summer Olympics in Beijing, by reaching an A-standard time of 4:00:00 from the European Athletics Race Walking Permit Meeting. He successfully finished the 50 km race walk in forty-seventh place by more than a second behind Hungary's Zoltán Czukor, outside his personal best time of 4:21:26.

References

External links

NBC 2008 Olympics profile

Slovak male racewalkers
Living people
Olympic athletes of Slovakia
Athletes (track and field) at the 2004 Summer Olympics
Athletes (track and field) at the 2008 Summer Olympics
Sportspeople from Brezno
1972 births